Grgich Hills Estate (formerly Grgich Hills Cellar) is a winery located in Rutherford, California in the heart of the Napa Valley.  The winery changed its name in 2006 when it first began producing only "estate grown" wines made from grapes grown exclusively in vineyards owned by the winery.  The Napa Valley Wine Train has a passenger stop located at Grgich Hills Estate. Grgich Hills' vineyards are certified organic and biodynamic and it converted to solar energy in 2006.

History 
The colors in the winery's first sign reflect the winery was born on July 4, 1977.
Winemaker Mike Grgich had gained international recognition at the historic Paris Wine Tasting of 1976 when the Chardonnay he produced at Chateau Montelena won first prize among white wines.  Grgich and Austin Hills (of Hills Brothers Coffee) soon became business partners and established Grgich Hills Cellar on July 4, 1977.  The name Grgich Hills does not describe a geographical feature but is instead a combination of the names of the winery's founders.

Wines 
The winery's very first vintage was the winner of the 221-entry Chardonnay Shootout with wines from around the world. It was conducted by Craig Goldwyn, wine critic of the Chicago Tribune in 1980. Judges were mostly wine educators from around the nation gathered for the annual convention of the Society of Wine Educators.

References

External links 
 Grgich Hills Estate website

Food and drink companies established in 1977
Wineries in Napa Valley
Companies based in Napa County, California
1977 establishments in California